Megan Griffiths (born April 22, 1975) is a film and television director who resides in Seattle, Washington, U.S., and is a board member of Northwest Film Forum.

Early life and education
Megan Griffiths was born in Ohio, lived in Moscow, Idaho in her teens, attended Moscow High School, and was an undergraduate at the University of Idaho where she earned a B.A. in visual communications in 1997.

She received an MFA in Film Production from Ohio University School of Film in 2000.

Career

Film 
Griffiths wrote and directed her first feature film, First Aid For Choking, which was released in 2003.  Griffiths subsequently worked as a producer and first assistant director on features in and around Seattle including Zoo, The Immaculate Conception of Little Dizzle, The Catechism Cataclysm, and Your Sister's Sister. 

Her second feature The Off Hours world premiered at the 2011 Sundance Film Festival and went on to receive a nomination at the 2011 Independent Spirit Awards for Ben Kasulke's cinematography.

Griffiths released Eden in 2012.  The film starred Jamie Chung, Matt O'Leary and Beau Bridges, and it told a story about a human trafficking survivor. The Stranger newspaper wrote, "Griffiths navigates the horrifying facts of her film with great respect," and her direction was described as "a veritable master class in how to make humane art out of inhumanity."

The following year she released a comedy titled Lucky Them.  The film, shot in Seattle, starred Toni Collette, along with Thomas Haden Church, Oliver Platt, and a cameo by Johnny Depp.  It premiered in the Special Presentation section at the 2013 Toronto International Film Festival.

Griffiths wrote and directed The Night Stalker, in which Lou Diamond Phillips played American serial killer Richard Ramirez.  The film co-starred Bellamy Young and was acquired by Lifetime Television.  It aired on June 12, 2016.

Her sixth feature Sadie starred Sophia Mitri Schoss, Melanie Lynskey, John Gallagher, Jr., Tony Hale, Danielle Brooks, Tee Dennard, and Keith L. Williams.  It premiered at the 2018 SXSW Film Festival. Variety said, "writer-director Megan Griffiths’ quietly absorbing and methodically disquieting drama is a genuine rarity."

I'll Show You Mine directed by Griffiths and starring Poorna Jagannathan and Casey Thomas Brown had its debut at Seattle International Film Festival on April 16, 2022.

Television 
In 2017, Griffiths directed two episodes of Room 104 broadcast on HBO. "Missionaries" premiered September 8, 2017, and "The Fight" premiered on October 6, 2017. Both episodes were written by Mark Duplass. "Missionaries" was nominated for a 2018 GLAAD Media Award in the "Outstanding Individual Episode" category for its portrayal of two Latter Day Saints companions who begin to question their stereotypes on sexuality.
Later that year, Griffiths directed one episode of Epix series Graves starring Nick Nolte and Sela Ward titled "They Die Happier" which premiered on December 3, 2017.

Griffiths directed one episode of TNT series Animal Kingdom titled "Prey" and starring Ellen Barkin. "Prey" premiered on June 26, 2018.

Four shows directed by Griffiths aired in 2019. First was "Like  A F-ing God Or Something", Episode 6 of The Society on Netflix. It premiered on May 10, 2019. Her second television job that year was a return to Animal Kingdom. Griffiths directed "Tank" which aired on June 18, 2019. Her third show that year was Episode 6 of Hulu's Looking For Alaska, "We Are All Going," which aired on October 18, 2019 and starred Kristine Froseth. Finally she directed one episode of the Fox Broadcasting Company series Prodigal Son titled "All Souls And Sadists" and broadcast on October 28, 2019.

Griffiths directed one episode of USA Network series Dare Me starring Herizen Guardiola and Willa Fitzgerald titled "Fog Of War" which aired on March 1, 2020.
 She also directed two episodes of the Netflix series Trinkets starring Brianna Hildebrand titled "Same Time Last Year" and "Black Friday" which both aired on Aug 25, 2020.

She directed two episodes of Amazon Studios show Panic. Episode 7 titled "Trust" and episode 8 titled "Returns" both premiered on May 28, 2021.

Griffiths next directed episode eight in Season one of HBO Max series Pretty Little Liars: Original Sin. The episode, written by Michael Grassi & Stasia Demick, was titled "Chapter Eight: Bad Blood" and it aired August 18, 2022.

Awards
2011 Emergent Narrative Female Director audience award, South by Southwest
2012 The Stranger Genius Award for Film
2013 City Arts magazine Film Artist of the year.
2015 Seattle Mayor's Award for Outstanding Achievement in Film
2018 Gryphon Award, Giffoni Film Festival

Filmography

Television
$5 Cover: Seattle (2010) – First Assistant Director
Room 104 (2017) – Director, Season 1, Episode 7: "Missionaries"
Room 104 (2017) – Director, Season 1, Episode 11: "The Fight"
Graves (2017) – Director, Season 2, Episode 8: "They Die Happier"
Animal Kingdom (2018) – Director, Season 3, Episode 5: "Prey"
The Society (2019) – Director, Season 1, Episode 6: "Like a F-ing God or Something"
Animal Kingdom (2019) – Director, Season 4, Episode 4: "Tank"
Looking For Alaska (2019) – Director, Episode 6: "We Are All Going"
Prodigal Son (2019) – Director, Season 1, Episode 6: "All Souls And Sadists"
Dare Me (2020) – Director, Season 1, Episode 9: "Fog of War"
Trinkets (2020) – Director, Season 2, Episode 7: "Same Time Last Year"
Trinkets (2020) – Director, Season 2, Episode 8: "Black Friday"
Panic (2021) – Director, Season 1, Episode 7: "Trust"
Panic (2021) – Director, Season 1, Episode 8: "Returns"
Pretty Little Liars: Original Sin (2022) – Director, Season 1, Chapter 8: "Bad Blood"

Films 
Shag Carpet Sunset (2002) – Director of Photography
First Aid for Choking (2003) – Writer/Director/Producer
Urban Scarecrow (2006) – Cinematographer
We Go Way Back (2006) – First Assistant Director
The Guatemalan Handshake (2006) – Producer/First Assistant Director
June and July (2006) – First Assistant Director
Zoo (2007) – Assistant Director
Cthulhu (2007) – First Assistant Director
Butterfly Dreaming (2008) – First Assistant Director
Moving (short) (2008) – Writer/Director
The Immaculate Conception of Little Dizzle (2009) – First Assistant Director
The Day My Parents Became Cool (short) (2009) – First Assistant Director
The Whole Truth (2009) – First Assistant Director
Crimes of the Past (2009) – First Assistant Director
Wrong Turn at Tahoe (2009) – First Assistant Director
Eros (short) (2009) – Writer/Director
Late Autumn (2010) – First Assistant Director
The Catechism Cataclysm (2011) – Producer/Assistant Director/Casting Director
The Off Hours (2011) – Writer/Director/Editor/Casting
Eden (2013) – Writer/Director
Lucky Them (2014) – Director
Rat Pack Rat (2014) – Producer
The Night Stalker (2016) – Director
Sadie (2018) – Writer/Director
I'll Show You Mine (2022) – Director

References

External links

Ohio University alumni
University of Idaho alumni
Living people
People from Moscow, Idaho
Filmmakers from Seattle
Film directors from Idaho
American women film directors
American women cinematographers
American cinematographers
1975 births